Nevada County is the name of two counties in the United States:

 Nevada County, Arkansas 
 Nevada County, California

See also
 List of counties in Nevada
 Nevada (disambiguation)